The Neoteuthidae are a family of squid comprising four monotypic genera.

Species
 Alluroteuthis
 Alluroteuthis antarcticus, Antarctic neosquid
 Narrowteuthis
 Narrowteuthis nesisi
 Neoteuthis
 Neoteuthis thielei
 Nototeuthis
 Nototeuthis dimegacotyle

References

External links

 Tree of Life web project: Neoteuthidae

Squid
Cephalopod families
Taxa named by Adolf Naef